The 2008 FINA Women's Water Polo World League was the fifth edition of the event, organised by the world's governing body in aquatics, the FINA. After three preliminary rounds the Super Final was held in Santa Cruz del Tenerife, Spain from June 10 to June 15, 2008.

Preliminary round

Americas
 and  qualified without qualification tournament.

Asia/Oceania
Held in Tianjin, China 

May 20

May 21

May 22

May 23

May 24

May 25

Europe
Held in Siracusa, Italy and Athens, Greece.

Spain qualified as the hosting nation of the Super Final

May 23

May 24

May 25

May 30

May 31

June 1

Super Final
Held in Santa Cruz de Tenerife, Spain

Preliminary

June 10

June 11

June 12

June 13

June 14

5th place match
June 15

Bronze medal match
June 15

Gold medal match
June 15

Final ranking

References

2008
World League
World League
International water polo competitions hosted by Spain